Ruby Ridge is a  mountain ridge in the Kaniksu National Forest (administered as part of the Idaho Panhandle National Forests) in northeastern Boundary County, Idaho, United States.

The other Ruby Ridge has an elevation , is also located within the Kaniksu National Forest, and is the only other landform so named within the United States. The other, more proximate, Ruby Ridge gained notoriety after an armed standoff that occurred nearby in late August 1992, in which two civilians and one officer of the United States Marshals Service were killed.

References

External links

Ridges of Idaho
Landforms of Boundary County, Idaho
Idaho Panhandle National Forest